The 1994 CECAFA Cup was the 20th edition of the tournament. It was held in Kenya, and was won by Tanzania. The matches were played between November 26–December 10.

Kenya sent two teams: Kenya A and Kenya B.

Group stage

Group A
Played in Nairobi

Group B

Knockout stage

Semi-finals

Third place match

Final

References
RSSSF archives

CECAFA Cup
International association football competitions hosted by Kenya